Islands of Slaves is a 1970 novel by Danish author Thorkild Hansen. It won the Nordic Council's Literature Prize in 1971.

References

1970 Danish novels
Danish-language novels
Nordic Council's Literature Prize-winning works
Danish historical novels